Duško is a Slavic masculine given name. It may refer to:

Duško Đurišić (born 1977), Montenegrin football player
Duško Ajder (born 1958), retired Serbian professional footballer
Duško Gojković (born 1931), Serbian jazz trumpeter and composer
Duško Ivanović (born 1957), Montenegrin basketball coach and a former basketball player
Duško Pavasovič (born 1976), Slovenian chess player and grandmaster
Duško Popov (1912–1981), Serbian double agent
Duško Pijetlović (born 1985), Serbian water polo player
Duško Radinović (born 1963), former Montenegrin association footballer
Duško Savić, former Bosnian-Serb association footballer
Duško Sikirica (born 1964), Bosnian Serb who was charged by the International Criminal Tribunal for the Former Yugoslavia
Duško Stajić (born 1982), Serbian professional footballer
Duško Tadić (born 1955), Bosnian Serb who was convicted by the International Criminal Tribunal for the Former Yugoslavia
Duško Tošić (born 1985), Serbian football player
Duško Trifunović (born 1933), Serbian poet and writer
Duško Vujošević (born 1959), Serbian and Montenegrin basketball coach

Bulgarian masculine given names
Croatian masculine given names
Macedonian masculine given names

Serbian masculine given names
Slovene masculine given names
Ukrainian masculine given names